Zdravko Dragićević (born June 17, 1986) is ex Montenegrin footballer he played last season for FK Budva like coach and player in the Montenegrin Third League. When he finished his career, he continue working as a coach.

Playing career

Club
Born in Montenegrin capital Podgorica, he started playing football at FK Mogren, he played for all selections of the Montenegrin national team, Dragićević played with FK Mogren, FK Obilić, OFK Petrovac, OFK Grbalj, Persib Bandung, Balestier Khalsa , Đồng Tâm Long An. And Hoàng Anh Gia Lai

References

1986 births
Living people
Footballers from Podgorica
Association football forwards
Serbia and Montenegro footballers
Montenegrin footballers
Montenegro under-21 international footballers
FK Mogren players
FK Obilić players
OFK Petrovac players
OFK Grbalj players
Persib Bandung players
Balestier Khalsa FC players
Long An FC players
Hoang Anh Gia Lai FC players
Second League of Serbia and Montenegro players
Montenegrin First League players
Liga 1 (Indonesia) players
Singapore Premier League players
V.League 1 players
Montenegrin expatriate footballers
Expatriate footballers in Indonesia
Montenegrin expatriate sportspeople in Indonesia
Expatriate footballers in Singapore
Montenegrin expatriate sportspeople in Singapore
Expatriate footballers in Vietnam
Montenegrin expatriate sportspeople in Vietnam